Karl Heinz Schwab (16 August 1924 – 1 September 2014), known professionally as Ralf Bendix, was a German Schlager singer, music producer, composer and songwriter.

Biography 
Early on, Ralf Bendix played the modern music of his time in bands, both as a soldier and in American custody. He began his studies - which he financed as a guitarist at the  venue of Frankfurt - in order to become a lawyer and economist, and graduated in 1952. He was then appointed head of the Düsseldorf office of the Trans World Airlines. He held that position until 1962, although he had been already active as a Schlager singer for seven years.

His artistic career began with a performance as a singer in a regional television show in the American city of Pittsburgh in 1955. In the same year, he was also discovered in a young talent competition for the German music market. His successful performance was rewarded with a recording contract with Paul Kuhn at Electrola. The engagement of the record company quickly paid off, when in June 1956, Ralf Bendix, now his artist's name, was noticed for the first time when the title "She was called Mary-Ann" - a cover version of "Sixteen Tons" with German text by  - was recorded and rose to the second place of the German hit singles chart. In 1958, he played a part along Fred Bertelmann in the music film  in which he performed the hit song "Die Sonne von Andalucia".

In addition, Ralf Bendix appeared under the pseudonym "Johnny Guitar" and published a total of four more singles on Electrola.

Altogether, in the following years, 24 of his songs, mostly German versions of Italian and American hits, were placed in the German hit lists. His most successful interpretation was the self - produced German cover of the "Babysitter-Boogie", which, after it was issued in April 1961, stayed five weeks at No. 1, and earned him a Golden Record. Even the baby voices were newly recorded, Klein-Elisabeth was the daughter of Electrola producer Hans Bertram. With this upbeat tune, he had a lasting success until 1964. Ralf Bendix displayed a more serious side of his activity with the Germanisation of American gospel songs and new spiritual songs; His attempt to create a new danse genre with "Tumba Tumbala" in 1972, however, was not successful. Other activities were more successful: From the end of the 1960s onwards, Ralf Bendix made a name for himself as a producer and talent maker. His discoveries included Heino, who was also produced by Bendix.

After he retired from show business, Ralf Bendix lived in Monaco and Florida and then in Switzerland, where he died on 1 September 2014 aged 90.

Discography

Hit records (singles) 
(Musikmarkt Top 30/50)

 *Airplay Top 50

Films 
 1958: 
 1959: 
 1959: Haus Vaterland (Tausend Sterne leuchten)
 1961: What Is Father Doing in Italy?
 1961:

Television 
 1985: WWF-Club (TV series)
 1970:  (TV series)
 1966:–1970 Die Drehscheibe (TV series)
 1970: Star Parade (TV series)
 1969:  (TV series)
 1967–1974: Haifischbar (TV series)
 1966: Ab morgen haben wir Humor (TV film)
 1966:  (TV series)
 1966: Der nächste Urlaub kommt bestimmt (TV series)
 1965: Vom Ersten das Beste (TV film)
 1965: Deutsche Schlagerfestspiele 1965 (TV film)
 1965: Gala 65 (TV film)
 1964: Show hin – Schau her (TV film)
 1963: Strandgeflüster (TV film)
 1962: Deutsche Schlagerfestspiele 1962 (TV film)

References

Bibliography 
 Frank Laufenberg: Rock & Pop Lexikon. Econ Taschenbuch Verlag 1998, Volume 1, p. 127.
 : Hitbilanz Deutsche Chart Singles 1956–1980. Taurus Press 1987, .

External links 
 
 Ralf Bendix bei steffi-line.de
 Ralf Bendix bei memoryradio

Schlager musicians
German male singers
German record producers
Musicians from Dortmund
1924 births
2014 deaths